Yangzhou Township is a township under the administration of Wuning County, Jiangxi, China. , it has 6 villages under its administration.

References 

Township-level divisions of Jiangxi
Wuning County